(1936 – 21 June 2014) was an American artist, art historian and inventor, who contributed to the structural film movement in the late 1960s and early 1970s.

Biography
Born in Connecticut in 1936, Lawder attended Williams College and the National Autonomous University of Mexico as an undergraduate, and studied at the Ludwig Maximilian University of Munich. While at the University of Munich, he became a test subject for a neurologist researching phosphenes at around 1960. During these experiments, he was injected with measured amounts of LSD, mescaline and psilocybin, and "spent a whole day in the clinic". In this, he became an early subject of psychedelics. Afterwards, he received his doctor of philosophy as an art historian at Yale University. His thesis, which was later published as The Cubist Cinema, examines the correlation between the history of film and its impact on modern art, described as a holistic overview by Anthony Reveaux in Film Quarterly.

His body of work is purported to span over 25 films and his literary works encapsulates several essays on experimental film. His first endeavors with experimental films started in his basement during a sabbatical of his in the late 1960s and early 1970s. One of his works during this span, Necrology, has been cited by fellow filmmaker Hollis Frampton as "the sickest joke I've ever seen on film".

For several decades Standish ran a Community Non-Profit Darkroom called the Denver Darkroom. It began as Standish's dream workspace which he cordially extended to visiting Filmmakers, Artists, Journalists and Friends. It was an artistic hotspot housing a large commercial-size black and white darkroom, studios, a library, a kitchen, a dining room/ gallery and sleeping lofts/ prop storage. The demand for the community darkroom was huge and it became a non-profit in 1998, accepting paid memberships to cover operating costs. Beginning in 2000 classes in Photography were offered by Artists and faculty of Metropolitan State College of Denver (now MSU) at the Denver Darkroom.

Lawder's wife, Ursula, was the daughter of Richard Strauss-Ruppel and Frieda Ruppel, who later married Dadaist artist Hans Richter. Lawder died in 2014.

Inventions

For the production of his first two films, Runaway and Corridor, Lawder built his own contact printer using an incandescent light bulb housed within a coffee can. With it, he would expose his films by manipulating the brightness of the light bulb, then shined the beam it created through the flashlight tube to the film gate of his camera.

Preservation
The Academy Film Archive has preserved several of Standish Lawder's films, including "Necrology," "Catfilm For Katy and Cynnie," and "Raindance."

Selected filmography
 3 x 3: A Tic-Tac-Toe Sonata in 3 Moves (1963)
 Budget Film (1969)
 Catfilm for Ursula (1969)
 Construction Job (1969)
 Eleven Different Horses (1969)
 Headfilm (1969)
 Roadfilm (1969)
 Runaway (1969)
 Specific Gravity (1969)
 Corridor (1970)
 Dangling Participle (1970)
 Necrology (1971)
 Color Film (1971)
 Prime Time (1972)
 Raindance (1972)
 Sixty Suicide Notes (1972)
 Sunday in Southbury (1972)
 Automatic Diaries 1971–73 (1973)
 Catfilm for Katy and Cynnie (1973)
 Regeneration (1980)

Bibliography

Books

Essays
 
 ———;

References

External links
 
 on Ubuweb

1936 births
20th-century American non-fiction writers
American experimental filmmakers
American inventors
American art historians
American film historians
National Autonomous University of Mexico alumni
People from Connecticut
Williams College alumni
Writers from Connecticut
Yale University alumni
2014 deaths
20th-century American male writers
American male non-fiction writers